The 1968 Six Hour Le Mans was an endurance motor race open to Sports Cars and Touring Cars. The event was staged at the Caversham circuit in Western Australia on 3 June 1968.

Cars competed in three groups:
 Sports Cars
 Group C Improved Production Touring Cars
 Group E Series Production Touring Cars

Results

Note: Results omitted from above table are:

15th: No 33, B Cole, B Cleaver, Austin-Healey Sprite, 163 laps
17th: No 8, Rod Waller/Bob Webb, Repco Holden Sports, 160 laps
18th: No 51, Mal McKiggan, Fiat 850 Coupe, 160 laps
19th: No 12, Rod Mitchell, Peugeot, 159 laps
20th: No 52, Ken Glasgow, Morris Minor, 152 laps
21st: No 35, Ray Johnson, P Dover, Holden, 150 laps
22nd: No 21, Norm Scott, Peugeot 203, 149 laps
25th: No 15, John Collins, Jim Currie, Bob Biltoft, Holden, 132 laps

References
 A History Of Australian Motor Sport, © 1980
 Around The Houses, © 1980
 Racing Car News, July 1968
 The West Australian, Tuesday, 4 June 1968
 www.terrywalkersplace.com retrieved 24 November 2011

Six Hours Le Mans
Six Hours Le Mans